Candy Paint may refer to:

Candy paint, a series of colors used in car customization originated by Joe Bailon

Entertainment
Candy Paint, a 2005 film short written and directed by Andrew Waller
"Candy Paint", a 2007 song from Strength & Loyalty album by Bone Thugs-n-Harmony
"Candy Paint & Gold Teeth", a 2012 song from Triple F Life: Friends, Fans & Family album by Waka Flocka Flame
"Candy Paint" (song), a 2017 song by Post Malone